Frank Earl Marble (July 21, 1918 – August 11, 2014) was an American scientist who worked in the field of aerodynamics and combustion. He obtained his Bachelor's degree in Mechanical Engineering in 1940 and Master's degree in Applied Mathematics in 1942, both from Case Institute of Technology. He obtained an engineer's degree in 1947 and PhD in 1948 under the supervision of Theodore von Kármán and Hans W. Liepmann from California Institute of Technology.

Marble worked at Caltech until his retirement in 1989. He was an elected member of National Academy of Engineering (1974) and National Academy of Sciences (1989).

References

External links
 
 Finding Aid to the Frank E. Marble Papers Caltech Archives, California Institute of Technology

1918 births
2014 deaths
Fluid dynamicists
American engineers
Members of the United States National Academy of Engineering
California Institute of Technology faculty
Members of the United States National Academy of Sciences
Scientists from Cleveland